Trevelyan College (known colloquially as Trevs) is a college of Durham University, England. Founded in 1966, the college takes its name from social historian George Macaulay Trevelyan (pronounced "Trevillian"), Chancellor of the University from 1950 to 1957. Originally an all-female college (the last to open in England), the college became fully mixed in 1992.

Trevelyan is noted in Durham for its hexagon-featuring architecture and for the display of daffodils that surrounds it every spring. As a constituent college of Durham University, Trevelyan is listed as a higher education institution under the Education Reform Act 1988. It is owned and for the most part run by the university.

History
During the early 1960s, the British Government commissioned the Robbins Report to look into the future of higher education in the UK. When published, the report recommended the expansion of universities and the student population. This was accepted as government policy. In 1963, the University of Newcastle was officially established as a separate entity from the University of Durham, which meant that new colleges within Durham were required in order to meet the number of new university places that the Government wished to create. As a result, the university planned for three new colleges on Elvet Hill; these went on to become Collingwood, Trevelyan and Van Mildert.

New women's college
Trevelyan was planned to become an all-women college, similar to St Mary's and St Aidan's, so as to increase the female population of the student body. The college was built on farmland south of St Mary's off Elvet Hill Road, which was owned by a local family, the Carpenters. Originally this land was intended to accommodate not only the new college, but also a University Assembly Hall with a capacity of 1,500 persons; however, the site was too small to accommodate both buildings.

After much delay, the college was opened in October 1966 with 78 students. The official opening took place on 12 March 1968 by Lord Butler, Master of Trinity College, Cambridge, who was invited in view of the connection G. M. Trevelyan also held with Trinity. During the opening, a serenade in three movements composed by Sir Malcolm Arnold (whose daughter was in the first intake of students), called "The Trevelyan Suite", was played. Other people at the opening include the Chancellor, the Vice-Chancellor, two Pro-Vice-Chancellors, the Bishops of Durham and of Ripon (whose wife, Mary Moorman, was a relative of Trevelyan and also present) and the Mayor and Mayoress of Durham. Trevelyan was the last purpose-built all-female college to be built for a British university.

Since opening
In 1973, a 300-person capacity hall, the Sir James Knott Hall, (known colloquially as the "JKH") was opened in the presence of the Duke of Northumberland. The purpose of the hall was to provide more facilities for Trevelyan students, such as a badminton court and extra music rooms, as well as to create a conference facility for the purpose of wealth creation for the college. In 1988 an extension to the hall, the Dowrick Suite, was added, named after a professor of the law department, Frank Dowrick, who was a longtime member of the Senior Common Room. Inside the main college building is the Mowlam Room, a postgraduate common room which previously housed a bust of Mo Mowlam, a well-known Trevs alumna. This bust is currently located in the entrance hall of the college.

In 1981, the bar, which had previously been located within the small area now hosting the buttery was moved to its present location in the former cloisters of the college. In order to make this a practical bar environment the cloisters were roofed over. The area above this new roof is nicknamed "The Goldfish Bowl" by students, due to the proximity of the windows looking into other rooms.

In 1987, the Governing Body of the college voted to follow Hatfield and Castle in becoming mixed-sex, despite 68% of college members voting against such a change. In 1991 a new accommodation block was added to the main building. This block, the K block, is entirely ensuite and now typically reserved for final year and postgraduate students.

The college became fully mixed in 1992. In 1993, and again in 2010, the bar underwent refurbishment. In 2000, a tennis court was added to the grounds at the back of the college. In 2021 Adekunle Adeyeye (College Principal) was reported to have created a culture of bullying, sexism and intimidation of staff

Buildings

The internal construction of Trevelyan is unusual, comprising a string of hexagon-shaped blocks, resulting in most rooms containing unusual angles.

At the opening of the college, its architect John Eastwick-Field said of the design of the college:

The original blocks are labelled "A" to "J", though there is no I Block to be found and there is also a modern block of ensuite bedrooms, K Block, also called the Macaulay Suite, named after Lord Macaulay, G. M. Trevelyan's great-uncle.

The layout features rooms based around staircases, landings and courtyards. The entrance hall is referred to as "the Cobbles", although said cobbles are no longer there, having been removed during a recent modern refit. A third of the college was fully refurbished in 2005.

Approximately 320 fully catered students can be housed in the building, and around 790 are members of the college, making Trevelyan the third-smallest of Durham's seventeen colleges, and the smallest of those maintained by the university council.

The building's design has won it a Civic Design Award.

Facilities
Trevs has its own comprehensive library, which is open 24 hours a day; music practice room; recording studio; cinema room; computer room; bar; buttery; and fitness suite; it also possesses a chapel, the Barn, which is used for prayer, talks and musical and dramatic rehearsals.

The Undercroft, a relaxing seating area, links the bar with the rear of the college. The college also has a central quad, although it is actually an irregular icosagon, a setting for the college's musical events and formal ball. To the rear of the college there are landscaped lawns and a tennis court.

The Sir James Knott Hall, catering for sports, theatrical and conference events is situated just across the college main entrance.

Student life

Common rooms 
All members of college are members of a common room. Undergraduates are members of the Junior Common Room (JCR). They may opt out of the common room if they wish, although if they do so they are not allowed to attend JCR events, such as the informal and formal ball, or Formal Hall. The JCR annually elects an Executive Committee consisting of eleven members as well as an impartial Chair. The Executive Committee ensures the successful running of the JCR, in conjunction with the College Officers. The rules of the JCR are stated in the standing orders, which can only be amended by resolution of the JCR members during general meetings.

Postgraduate and some senior undergraduate students, including [Adult learner|mature students], are members of the Middle Common Room (MCR), which hosts its own events and operates similarly to the JCR. The MCR has its own standing orders and Executive Committee consisting of eleven elected members.

Administrative, academic and other members of college are members of the Senior Common Room (SCR).

Arts
The college has a strong history of music, art, and the performing arts. The college has hosted, and continues to host, art viewings both of local and international artists, as well as boasting a large art collection of its own. This collection includes six specially commissioned John Walker paintings which hang in the dining hall. The college hosts at least one musical per year, with recent productions including Anything Goes (2012), Annie Get Your Gun (2013), Thoroughly Modern Millie (2014), My Favourite Year (2015), Shout! (2015), Oklahoma! (2016), Sunshine on Leith (2016), . The college has an orchestral society, a choir, a flute choir, a string group, an a cappella group, chamber singers and a jazz band; The Manglers, who are regular performers at jazz evenings across the university. The college also has a theatre company, Sixth Side Theatre, which puts on productions several times a year.

Sport

The college also has a strong sporting profile, finishing 5th in the college league table in 2008/9. The college has also in recent years been college champions of women's hockey, Women's astro football, Basketball (both men's and women's) and Badminton, which saw Men's A finish the session undefeated. The college cheer team has also found success; winning both All Girl Groups Stunt and Co-Ed Level 2, at the 2019 Intercollegiate Comp. They were also crowned Grand Champions in the same year. Trevelyan College Boat Club is one of the few college rowing teams to qualify for Henley Royal Regatta. The college rugby club made headlines in 2017 after planning to hold a 'Miners versus Thatcher' social. As a result of the controversy the club was suspended for the remainder of the season.

Other
Student societies play an important role in college life, with active language (Trevs Lingo), film and LGBT societies. Previously, the college ran a monthly magazine called Hex magazine, named in tribute to the college's interesting hexagonal shape.

Traditions
The college holds Formal Hall once a fortnight, in which students enter the dining hall in their academic gowns, which must remain worn until the end of silent grace. The formal is signalled over when the JCR and MCR presidents bow out formally to the Principal and student body. Traditionally, "spoon banging" (in which student attendees loudly bang their spoons on the table) occurs immediately following the departure of high table.
JCR events are held every year, with an informal ball being held at the end of Michaelmas term, and a summer ball being held after exams in Easter term.
Academic gowns are also worn at university matriculation, at college matriculation and at graduation.

The annual Trevs Day takes place after exams in Easter term, and is a focus of much celebration and revelry for students. Each year it receives a different theme, with recent themes including 'Heroes and Villains' (2014), 'Charlie and the Chocolate Factory' (2015), 'Rio 2016' (2016), 'Tropical Beach Party' (2017) and 'Wild West' (2018). The college also hosts TrevStock, an annual music festival for college and university bands which takes place in the quad.

The college regulations once stated that "any student found picking the daffodils shall be hanged, and quartered at dawn on Palace Green."

Coat of arms
The college arms are modelled closely on the arms of the Trevelyan family, whose crest features a swimming horse, commemorating the legend of the first Trevelyan, who swum his horse from St Michael's Mount to the mainland of Cornwall for a wager, the other knights of Arthur's court having drowned.

The arms of Trevelyan College are blazoned as follows:

Shield: Gules issuant from water in base barry wavy of four Argent and Azure a demi horse forcene Or, in chief three Saint Cuthbert's crosses Argent

Crest: Out of a coronet composed of sixteen fleurs-de-lis set upon a rim alternately large and small a lyre Or, mantled Gules doubled Argent

Motto
The college motto, Vera Fictis Libentius, was taken from the inscription of the 1875 statue of Lord Macaulay in the antechamber of the chapel of Trinity College, Cambridge. In the early 1980s, a competition was held to name the horse. Its eventual name, Vera, stems from a student innocently assuming that the college motto, Vera Fictis Libentius, was referring to the horse.

Connections with the Trevelyan family
Trevelyan College still maintains a number of connections with the greater Trevelyan family, some of these include:

 Mary Moorman, daughter of G.M. Trevelyan, was a member of the Senior Common Room and was awarded an honorary doctor of letters from Durham
 Humphrey Trevelyan, Baron Trevelyan, a member of the Trevelyan Governing Body from 1970 until 1977. Lord Trevelyan arranged the grant from the Sir James Knott Trust that provided funding for the Sir James Knott Hall.
 The artists Julian Trevelyan and Mary Fedden, some of whose work is owned by the college. Mrs Fedden provided significant donations for prizes for original works of art by college members.
 Jon and Karen Trevelyan, who are both college tutors.

College officers and fellows

List of principals 
 Joan Bernard 1965–1979
 Deborah Lavin 1979–1995
 George Marshall 1995–1996
 Malcolm Todd 1996–2000
 Nigel Martin 2000–2008
 H. Martyn Evans 2008–2019
 Adekunle Adeyeye 2019–present

Fellowships
The college has a tradition of visiting fellows, who typically stay for a term, giving a Trevelyan Lecture based upon their research areas. The college also hosts the Sir William Luce Fellowship, in a joint project with the Institute of Islamic and Middle-Eastern Studies. Past fellows have included academics from the UK-based Universities of Reading and Exeter, as well as the international Universities of Brown, Harvard, Khartoum, Tehran and Sultan Qaboos University in Oman

Honorary fellows
Honorary fellowships were awarded between 1996–98 to those people who have greatly aided or have a close association with the college. Normally such people are made members of the SCR.

 Mary Fedden
 Sir John James
 Deborah Lavin
 Sir Jack Zunz
 Sir Donald Hawley MBE
 Mo Mowlam

Trevelyan Society and Trust
The Trevelyan Society is the alumni organisation of the college, whose aims are to inform alumni of goings on in college as well as to keep alumni in touch with each other. It produces an annual magazine: "Hippocampus", a play on the arms of the college.
The Trevelyan Trust is a charitable fund aimed at providing prizes and bursaries for Trevelyan students.

Scholarships and prizes
Trevelyan has several scholarships and prizes that are awards to members of the college, some founded by the Trevelyan Trust, others from private donors. A partial list of scholarships and bursaries is included below:

The Helena Margaret Biss Scholarship
The Greenwood Merit Scholarship
The Deborah Lavin Scholarship
The Ove Arup Scholarship for the Built Environment
The Bruhl Scholarship for Modern Languages
The G.M. Trevelyan Scholarship
The Marion Zunz Travel Bursary

In addition to this the Boat Club also award the Dyfrig Williams Trophy to a member of college who has significantly contributed to college sport.

Notable alumni

 Lucy Beresford (writer, psychotherapist and media commentator)
 Dame Jill Black QC (Lord Justice of Appeal)
 David J. Bodycombe (puzzle writer)
 Joy Carter (Vice-Chancellor, University of Winchester)
 Pippa Greenwood (garden expert)
 Dianne Hayter, Baroness Hayter of Kentish Town (former General secretary of the Fabian Society and current chair of Labour Party National Executive Committee)
 Sophie Hosking (Olympic gold medal-winning rower)
 Mo Mowlam (former cabinet minister)
 Rachel Squire (former Labour MP)
 Minette Walters (thriller writer)

References

Bibliography
 Martin, Susan. (2006) Trevs: A Celebration of 40 Years. Durham: The Trevelyan Trust, Trevelyan College.

External links

 Trevelyan College official university website
 Trevelyan College JCR undergraduate student body's website
 Trevelyan College MCR postgraduate student body's website
 Trevelyan College SCR academic and pastoral body attached to the college
 Gallery of the college.

Colleges of Durham University

Educational institutions established in 1966
Former women's universities and colleges in the United Kingdom
1966 establishments in England